The Vermont Catamounts women's basketball team is the basketball team that represents the University of Vermont in Burlington, Vermont. The school's team currently competes in the America East Conference and plays its home games at Patrick Gym.

History
The Catamounts went undefeated in the regular season in back-to-back seasons in the 1991–92 and 1992–93 seasons, the first time a women's basketball program did that in the NCAA era. Only Connecticut has done that feat since Vermont did it. They have won the conference title six times, second only to Maine.

NCAA tournament results

References

External links